Udo Hempel  (born 3 November 1946) is a retired road and track cyclist from West Germany, who won the gold medal in the Men's 4.000 Team Pursuit at the 1972 Summer Olympics in Munich, alongside Günther Schumacher, Jürgen Colombo, and Günter Haritz. In the 1968 Summer Olympics, he had already won silver in the same event. He was a professional cyclist from 1973 to 1983, whose best results were on the track.

Hempel was also part of the West German team that won the gold medal in the amateur 4 km pursuit world championship in Leicester in 1970.

References

External links
 

1946 births
Living people
Sportspeople from Düsseldorf
German track cyclists
German male cyclists
Cyclists at the 1968 Summer Olympics
Cyclists at the 1972 Summer Olympics
Olympic cyclists of West Germany
Olympic gold medalists for West Germany
Olympic silver medalists for West Germany
Olympic medalists in cycling
Medalists at the 1968 Summer Olympics
Medalists at the 1972 Summer Olympics
Cyclists from North Rhine-Westphalia